Plectics (from Greek πλεκτός plektos, "woven") is the name that Murray Gell-Mann, a Nobel Laureate in Physics, has suggested for the research area described by Gell-Mann as "a broad transdisciplinary subject covering aspects of simplicity and complexity as well as the properties of complex adaptive systems, including composite complex adaptive systems consisting of many adaptive agents".

Etymology 
Murray Gell-Mann explains the derivation of the word as follows:

See also 
Computational cybernetics
Santa Fe Institute

References 

Systems theory